The Battle of Ghazni was fought in 1148 between the Ghurid army of Sayf al-Din Suri and the army of the Ghaznavid Sultan Bahram-Shah of Ghazna. The Ghurid ruler defeated Bahram-Shah and took the city while Bahram-Shah fled to India.

Bahram-Shah returned the next year and defeated and killed Sayf al-Din Suri and retook Ghazni.

Notes

References 

Ghazni 1148
Ghazni 1148
History of Ghazni Province
Ghazni 1148
1148 in Asia